The Spain-United Nations relations are the international relations between the United Nations (UN) and Spain.

History

Precedents 
The forerunner of the United Nations was the League of Nations, an organization that was established in 1919, after the signing of the Treaty of Versailles, “to promote international cooperation and achieve peace and security”, and to which Spain adhered as a founding country included in Annex I of the Treaty of Versailles (1920). The outbreak of the World War II revealed the failure of the League of Nations.

Membership of the organization 
Spain joined the UN on December 14 of 1955 and has been an elected member of the Security Council on five occasions; this is approximately once every ten years. The last one, in the 2015-2016 biennium. Throughout this period, and especially since the advent of democracy, Spain has been actively involved in the organization, reiterating the need for the international community to be based on the pillars of security, development and respect for human rights.

Economic contribution 
Spain ranks eleventh on the scale of financial contributions to the United Nations Regular Budget and is a member of the Geneva Group, made up of the largest contributors, which carries out exhaustive monitoring of administrative and budgetary issues in the United Nations system. , including their specialized Agencies and International Technical Organizations.

Organizations based in Spain 

The UN has several of its own organizations with headquarters in some Spanish cities:

 Madrid: World Tourism Organization.
 Barcelona: United Nations University - Institute for Globalization, Culture and Mobility.

References 

Spain
United Nations